Humbertia is a monotypic genus of flowering plants belonging to the family Convolvulaceae (morning glory family). It only contains one species, Humbertia madagascariensis Lam. It is native to Madagascar.

The genus name (Humbertia) is in honour of Philibert Commerson (1727–1773), a French naturalist, best known for accompanying Louis Antoine de Bougainville on his voyage of circumnavigation in 1766–1769. The Latin specific epithet, madagascariensis, means coming from Madagascar. Both genus and species were first described and published by Jean-Baptiste Lamarck in Encycl. Vol.2 on page 356 in 1786.

Description 
The outer bark is greyish-brown, with fine cracks, and the inner bark has whitish bands. The twigs bear prominent leaf scars and are covered in reddish hairs when young. The leathery, hairless leaves grow at the tips of the twigs and have short stalks. The small flowers have parts in fives and grow in the axils of the leaves, either singly or in small groups. The petals are creamy-white and hairy on the outside with membranous edges. The stamens and pistil project in a boss and are more than twice as long as the corolla. The fruit is a slightly fleshy brown berry containing one or two seeds.

Ecology 
The lowland forest in the east of Madagascar where this tree is found includes such characteristic species as Myristicaceae, Anthostema, Protium, Allantospermum, Magnistipula, Chaetocarpus, Tsebona macrantha, Perriera and Dialyceras. The birds living in this evergreen woodland include the brown mesite, the Madagascar serpent eagle, the scaly ground roller, the dusky tetraka, the red-tailed newtonia, the helmet vanga and the Bernier's vanga.

Human uses 
It can also be used for parquet flooring, sculptures, turning, mine props, railway sleepers, and agricultural implements. However, the tree has a limited range and has become rare, and is therefore in need of further research and protection.

A sesquiterpene alcohol of a new type has been isolated from the heartwood of the tree, and the class of sesquiterpenes of this type has been given the name humbertiol.

References

Convolvulaceae
Monotypic Convolvulaceae genera
Endemic flora of Madagascar
Flora of the Madagascar lowland forests
Plants described in 1786